Kunnathur may refer to the following places in India:

 Kunnathur, Kerala
 Kunnathur, Kerala Assembly constituency
 Kunnathur, Tamil Nadu Assembly constituency
 Kunnathur, Tirupur